Deoxycytidine monophosphate (dCMP), also known as deoxycytidylic acid or deoxycytidylate in its conjugate acid and conjugate base forms, respectively, is a deoxynucleotide, and one of the four monomers that make up DNA. In a DNA double helix, it will base pair with deoxyguanosine monophosphate.

See also
 Cytidine monophosphate

Nucleotides